Municipality of Concordia is a municipality in Sinaloa in northwestern Mexico.

According to 2010 census it had a population of 28,493 inhabitants.

Political subdivision 
Concordia Municipality is subdivided in 8 sindicaturas:
El Verde
Santa Lucía
Mesillas
Zavala
Agua Caliente de Gárate
Pánuco
Tepuxtla
Copala

References

Municipalities of Sinaloa